Eucalyptus uncinata, commonly known as the hook-leaved mallee, is a species of mallee that is endemic to the southwest of Western Australia. It has smooth bark, lance-shaped adult leaves, flower buds arranged in groups of nine to thirteen, creamy white flowers and barrel-shaped to oval or cylindrical fruit.

Description
It has smooth grey to light brown bark that is shed in short, curly strips, and sometimes a short stocking of fibrous bark near the base. Flowering occurs between January and April and the flowers are creamy white.

Taxonomy
Eucalyptus uncinata was first formally described by the botanist Nikolai Turczaninow in 1849 in the journal Bulletin de la Société Impériale des Naturalistes de Moscou from specimens collected by James Drummond. The specific epithet (uncinata) is from the Latin word uncinatus meaning "barbed" or "hooked", referring to the fine tip of the leaves.

Distribution and habitat
Hook-leaved mallee is found on coastal and sub-coastal sand plains and low hills between York, the Stirling Range, Salmon Gums and Israelite Bay, growing mostly in open shrubland.

The species is associated with the western mallee subgroup which is characterised by several eucalypts including Eucalyptus oleosa, Eucalyptus moderata, Eucalyptus incrassata, Eucalyptus foecunda, Eucalyptus redunca and Eucalyptus eremophila. The understorey is predominantly shrubby with species of Melaleuca and Acacia along with the occasional Triodia.

Conservation status
This eucalypt is classified as "not threatened" by the Western Australian Government Department of Parks and Wildlife.

See also
List of Eucalyptus species

References

uncinata
Endemic flora of Western Australia
Mallees (habit)
Myrtales of Australia
Eucalypts of Western Australia
Goldfields-Esperance
Great Southern (Western Australia)
Wheatbelt (Western Australia)
Plants described in 1849
Taxa named by Nikolai Turczaninow